Samuel "Sam" Onunaka Mbakwe (1929 – 5 January 2004) also known as Dee Sam was an Igbo politician and first democratic governor of Imo State, southern Nigeria from 1 October 1979 until 31 December 1983. The Sam Mbakwe International Cargo Airport, located in Owerri, the state capital, was renamed after him. In 1981, Sam Mbakwe set up Imo State University. The campus was located in a territory that was ceded to Abia State in 1991 and was re-christened Abia State University. However, Imo State University acquired a new campus in Owerri and still exists.

Early life and education

Mbakwe began his education in 1937 at St Peter's Primary School, Umulogho. His contemporaries include The Reverend Canon Jerimiah Anyanwu, the first Anglican priest in the old Etiti Local Government Area of Imo State, who was born at about the same time with him in Avutu. He studied at the Teachers Training College, Oleh, Isoko, from 1946 to 1947, and at Fourah Bay College in Sierra Leone in 1952. He moved on to the University of Manchester (1953–56), the University of Hull (1956–58), and finally the school run by the Inns of Court (1958–59), all in England, before returning to Nigeria to practice law in Port Harcourt, Eastern Region. Mbakwe served as an Administrator of Okigwe Province in the Republic of Biafra, an Igbo secessionist state in southeastern Nigeria, during the 1967–70 Civil War.

Political career
Mbakwe joined the Constituent Assembly in 1978 and became governor on 1 October of the following year. One of the main priorities of his administration was to improve Imo State's roads. He was re-elected, but his second term was interrupted by General Muhammadu Buhari's military coup of 31 December 1983, which brought about the end of the Second Republic. Described as "controversial," he said the following about politicians in September 1995: "If you have not been in prison before, that will be your baptism and qualification. You will learn from the prison yard that not all those in detention are criminals."

Mbakwe earned the nickname "the weeping governor" for crying while trying to convince the federal government to pay more attention to his state; the first occasion of his famed tears was the Ndiegoro flood in Aba, which was then a part of Imo State. He had invited President Shehu Shagari to witness the destruction done by the floods, and it was said that he was moved to tears while conducting the president around the disaster area. His 6 January 2004 death in Avutu, Obowo Local Government Area, came after a sickness that had set on in February 2002 and occurred shortly after a state-sponsored trip to Germany for treatment.

References

External links

1929 births
2004 deaths
Governors of Imo State
Igbo politicians
Fourah Bay College alumni
Year of birth unknown
Nigerian People's Party politicians